"Portrait of a Lady" is a poem by the Indian English poet and art critic Ranjit Hoskote. The poem won First Prize in the Seventh All India Poetry Competition conducted by The Poetry Society (India) in 1995. The poem brought the second major literary award for Hoskote, who also won the Sanskriti Award for Literature in 1996 and the Sahitya Akademi Golden Jubilee Award for lifetime achievement in 2005.

Excerpts from the poem

Objects are lesson: from bowls, hairpins, brooches,
you learn of forgotten lives. The stories say
my grandmother was a fever tree:
two birds sat on her branches, one pecking
at a grape, the other singing an aria.

 *****

What history's bookkeepers do not show
is the tremor down the spine she felt,
the tendril of blood that coiled in her nose
when the whistle of a train announced
her husband's return from a tour of duty.

 *****

In the stories, she's an actor, a pilgrim:
shadow-boxing with a thunderstorm,
she slips through brick walls,
treads a theatre of scrubbed floors
and ember beds. She leaves me
a loaf of shortbread in the oven,
a page of couplets in a script I cannot read
and wrapped in a peel of green appleskin,
a tea cup glazed with a Dutch windmill,
the last one of the set.

 *****

The urchin-cut waif in the vignette above
is the child she was. Voyeur, clairvoyant,
she stares in at windows, her head a gourd
hollowed by the age she never reached
in life, her hair a silver floss.

 *****

Objects are lessons: the light seeps
through the slats, sets off a shimmer
on her lace. She's crocheted the evening
and its creatures: the silken thread
that she pulls from her pattern
knots tight around my neck.

Comments and criticism

The poem has received critical acclaim since its first publication in 1997 in the book Emerging Voices and has since been widely anthologised. The poem has been frequently quoted in scholarly analysis of contemporary Indian English poetry.

See also
The Poetry Society (India)

Notes

External links
  Seventh National Poetry Competition 1997 – Award Winners
  Hoskote – A Profile by A J Thomas
  India Writes – Contemporary Indian Poetry
  Ranjit Hoskote Poems
  Biography of Hoskote
"Popular Indian Poems"

Indian poems
1997 poems
Works originally published in Indian magazines
Works originally published in literary magazines